Georg I Frederick Karl, Duke of Saxe-Meiningen (4 February 1761 in Frankfurt – 24 December 1803 in Meiningen), was Duke of Saxe-Meiningen from 1782 to 1803. He was known as a reformer and considered a model prince by many of his peers.

Family
Georg was born on 4 February 1761 at Frankfurt as the fourth but second surviving son of Anton Ulrich, Duke of Saxe-Meiningen and Charlotte Amalie of Hesse-Philippsthal. His father was 73 years old at the time and died two years later in 1763.

Reign
Georg succeeded his older and childless brother, Karl Wilhelm in the Duchy of Saxe-Meiningen in 1782. He ruled based on the principles of "enlightened absolutism" emphasizing in particular the importance of education. He initiated the building of the Gymnasium later named Bernhardinum after his son. Georg I also opened the ducal library to the public,  reformed the (Protestant) church practices in his princedom and initiated new social policies. Under a pen name he published philosophical treatises. As a result, many of his fellow princes considered him a model ruler and his duchy as the German state where enlightened absolutism reached its apogee.

Marriage and heir
In Langenburg on 27 November 1782, Georg married Luise Eleonore of Hohenlohe-Langenburg. After ten years they began to have children, finally having four:
Adelaide Luise Therese Karoline Amalie (b. Meiningen, 13 August 1792 – d. Bentley Priory, Middlesex, 2 December 1849), married on 11 July 1818 to the Duke of Clarence, later King William IV of the United Kingdom.
Ida (b. Meiningen, 25 June 1794 – d. Weimar, 4 April 1852), married on 30 May 1816 to Bernhard of Saxe-Weimar-Eisenach.
stillborn daughter (Meiningen, 16 October 1796).
Bernhard II Erich Freund, Duke of Saxe-Meiningen (b. Meiningen, 17 December 1800 – d. Meiningen, 3 December 1882).

Death
Georg I died of a fever on 24 December 1803 at Meiningen.

See also
 Schloss and park Altenstein

Ancestry

References
 Andrea Jakob, Meininger Museen: Herzog Georg I. von Sachsen-Meiningen - Ein Präzedenzfall für den aufgeklärten Absolutismus 2005, Südthüringer Forschungen Heft 33, 

1761 births
1803 deaths
House of Saxe-Meiningen
Dukes of Saxe-Meiningen
People from Meiningen
Princes of Saxe-Meiningen